Aela may refer to :

Places
 Aela (Arabia), the Ancient port city on the Red Sea and former bishopric in Palestina Tertia Salutaris, now Aqaba (Jordan)
 Aela (Estonia), an Estonian village in Harju County

People
 Aela Callan